Giorgia Zannoni (born 11 February 1998) is an Italian volleyball player for the Italian national team.

Career 
She participated at the 2015 FIVB Volleyball Girls' U18 World Championship, 
2016 Women's U19 Volleyball European Championship,  2017 FIVB Volleyball Women's U20 World Championship,  
and 2017–18 CEV Women's Champions League.

References

External links 
 http://www.legavolleyfemminile.it/?page_id=194&idat=ZAN-GIO-98
 CEV profile

1998 births
Living people
Italian women's volleyball players
Serie A1 (women's volleyball) players